The Way We Were is a 2018 Chinese romance drama directed by Liu Jiang and starring Tiffany Tang and Luo Jin. The series airs on both Dragon Television and Beijing Television from 14 May 2018 to 10 June 2018. The series centers on the lives of Chinese overseas students in the United States.

Synopsis
The story follows six Chinese students studying abroad in the U.S., chasing their dreams and becoming the elites of their respective majors. Shu Che and Miao Ying were originally a couple since middle school. Che left to study in America before Miao Ying since he is two years her senior. Both their parents forbade them from marrying when they were pursuing their post-grad degrees in America due to a major subway project that Che’s father, a mayor of Yan-zhou, has agreed to award the bid to Ying’s father through corrupt underhanded agreement. From the opposition of their marriage, Che found out about his father’s corruption and Miao Ying’s father’s briberies.
When Che turned his love interest to Xiao Qing after his failed relationship with Miao Ying, he never expect Xiao Qing’s father, an officer in the anti-corruption unit, will be the chief in charge of persecuting his father and Miao Ying’s father for bribery and corruption. 
Shu Che becomes involved in exposing his dad's criminal activity and shared his thoughts with Xiao Qing. When Xiao Qing’s father asked her to be the witness at trial, she is caught between being a witness and revealing the secret that Che shared with her. Ultimately, the culprit is revealed through investigations and evidence. There's a heavy price to pay for the culprits. Everyone matured in the process, understanding humanity and the value of life, returning to the path of justice.

Cast

Main
 Tiffany Tang as Xiao Qing
An aspiring law practitioner. 
 Luo Jin as Shu Che 
Son of a politician, and a law practitioner.
 Yu Jiwei as Ning Ming
A guy with an ordinary background. His crush on Miao Ying spurs him to work hard in life. 
 Xu Lingyue as Miao Ying
Shu Che's ex-girlfriend. A woman of outstanding family background and appearance.
 Wang Tianchen as Cheng Ran
Miao Ying's younger brother. A rebellious youth who has lacked familial love.
 Ma Chengcheng as Lü Ka
Cheng Ran's "wife", who conned him into a fake marriage due to her crush on him.

Supporting
 Wang Zhiwen as Shu Wang, Shu Che's father. An ambitious politician with grey areas of income.   
 Shi Ke as Yu Wen, Shu Che's mother.
 Zhang Xilin as Cheng Wei, Miao Ying's father. 
 Shi Jingming as He Yan, Xiao Qing's father. An honest and upright prosecutor.  
 Zhang Kaili as Xiao Yun, Xiao Qing's mother. 
 Qu Shanshan as Liu Caiqi
 Gao Liwen as Monica, Xiao Qing's landlord. 
 Lily Ho as Catherine, Xiao Qing's roommate and Benjamin's girlfriend.
 Kent Leung as Benjamin, Xiao Qing's roommate and Catherine's boyfriend. 
 Shan Mingkai as Assistant Wang, Shu Wang's assistant.
 Wang Ji as Monica's mother
 Xu Kaicheng as William

Soundtrack

Production
The series is directed by Liu Jiang (The Battle of Dawn) and written by Gao Xuan and Ren Baojia (My Youthfulness, Farewell Vancouver).

Principal photography began on 20 June 2017 and took place in various locations in the United States including Stanford University, University of Southern California, Los Angeles, San Francisco, and Las Vegas. Filming also took place in Beijing, Cambodia and Canada. The series wrapped up on December 6 of that same year.

Ratings 

 Highest ratings are marked in red, lowest ratings are marked in blue

Awards and nominations

References

External links
 
 

Dragon Television original programming
2018 Chinese television series debuts
2018 Chinese television series endings
Chinese romance television series
Television series by Perfect World Pictures
Television series by Hualu Baina Film & TV